"Jeg vil" is a song by Danish singer Basim. The song was released in Denmark in October 2008 as the second single from his debut studio album Alt det jeg ville have sagt (2008). The song has peaked to number 26 on the Danish Singles Chart.

Track listing

Chart performance

Weekly charts

Release  history

References

2008 singles
2008 songs
Basim songs
Universal Music Group singles